A Place Near Heaven (Spanish: Un rincón cerca del cielo) is a 1952 Mexican comedy drama film directed by Rogelio A. González and starring Pedro Infante, Marga López and Andrés Soler.

The film's art direction was by Jorge Fernández.

Main cast 
 Pedro Infante as Pedro González
 Marga López as Margarita
 Andrés Soler as Don Chema Pérez
 Antonio Aguilar as Catrín
 Silvia Pinal as Sonia Irina
 Luis Aceves Castañeda as Martín Araujo, el jefe
 Peque Navarro as Pepe
 Arturo Soto Rangel as Don Tenen
 Diana Ochoa as Supervisora oficina
 Guillermo Portillo Acosta as Borracho
 Juan Orraca as Don Antonio
 Mercedes Soler as Enfermera
 Joaquín García Vargas as Borracho
 Ricardo Camacho as Borracho

References

Bibliography 
 De la Mora, Sergio. Cinemachismo: Masculinities and Sexuality in Mexican Film. University of Texas Press, 2009.

External links 
 

1952 films
1952 comedy-drama films
Mexican comedy-drama films
1950s Spanish-language films
Films directed by Rogelio A. González
Films scored by Manuel Esperón
Mexican black-and-white films
1950s Mexican films